Véronique can refer to:
 Véronique (given name), a French female name
  Véronique River, a river in the Côte-Nord region of the province of Quebec, Canada.
 Véronique (rocket), a French sounding rocket
 Véronique (operetta), composed by André Messager in 1898
 Véronique, the stage name of French Canadian singer Véronique Béliveau
 the principal character in The Double Life of Véronique, a 1991 film by Krzysztof Kieślowski
 Véronique, a song from the musical "On the 20th Century", 1978
 Véronique, a song by "Pink Martini" from their 2004 album "Hang On Little Tomato"
 RTL Véronique, a Dutch television channel, later renamed RTL 4.